Żarnowiec is a village in Pomeranian Voivodeship, northern Poland.

Żarnowiec may also refer to:
 Żarnowiec, Greater Poland Voivodeship (west-central Poland)
 Żarnowiec, Subcarpathian Voivodeship (south-east Poland)
 Żarnowiec, Silesian Voivodeship (south Poland)